Norm Proft (born  1966) is a Canadian former competitive figure skater. He is the 1989 Grand Prix International de Paris bronze medalist and 1990 Skate Electric champion.

Personal life 
Proft was born around 1967 in North Vancouver, British Columbia, Canada. He married choreographer Julie Brault, and has a daughter, Emmanuelle (born  2002).

Career 
Proft switched from ice hockey to figure skating at age 11. Coached by Cynthia Ullmark, he was called up to compete in the junior event at the 1987 Canadian Championships after two skaters withdrew. He won gold at the event.

Internationally, he was awarded bronze medals at the 1988 Golden Spin of Zagreb and 1989 Grand Prix International de Paris, and gold at the 1990 Skate Electric.

Proft left amateur competition in 1991 and went on to skate in shows. He currently works for Skate Canada as Competitions Services Director.

Competitive highlights

References 

1960s births
Canadian male single skaters
Living people
Sportspeople from North Vancouver
20th-century Canadian people
21st-century Canadian people